The Soma cube is a solid dissection puzzle invented by Danish polymath Piet Hein in 1933 during a lecture on quantum mechanics conducted by Werner Heisenberg.

Seven pieces made out of unit cubes must be assembled into a 3×3×3 cube. The pieces can also be used to make a variety of other 3D shapes.

The pieces of the Soma cube consist of all possible combinations of three or four unit cubes, joined at their faces, such that at least one inside corner is formed. There is one combination of three cubes that satisfies this condition, and six combinations of four cubes that satisfy this condition, of which two are mirror images of each other (see Chirality). Thus, 3 + (6 × 4) is 27, which is exactly the number of cells in a 3×3×3 cube.

The Soma cube was popularized by Martin Gardner in the September 1958 Mathematical Games column in Scientific American. The book Winning Ways for your Mathematical Plays also contains a detailed analysis of the Soma cube problem.

There are 240 distinct solutions of the Soma cube puzzle, excluding rotations and reflections: these are easily generated by a simple recursive backtracking search computer program similar to that used for the eight queens puzzle. John Horton Conway and Michael Guy first identified all 240 possible solutions by hand in 1961.

Pieces
The seven Soma pieces are six polycubes of order four, and one of order three:

Production
Piet Hein authorized a finely crafted rosewood version of the Soma cube manufactured by Theodor Skjøde Knudsen's company Skjøde Skjern (of Denmark). Beginning in about 1967, it was marketed in the U.S. for several years by the game manufacturer Parker Brothers. Plastic Soma cube sets were also commercially produced by Parker Brothers in several colors (blue, red, and orange) during the 1970s. The package for the Parker Brothers version claimed there were 1,105,920 possible solutions. This figure includes rotations and reflections of each solution as well as rotations of the individual pieces. The puzzle is currently sold as a logic game by Piet Hein Trading and by ThinkFun (formerly Binary Arts) under the name Block by Block.

Solutions

Solving the Soma cube has been used as a task to measure individuals' performance and effort in a series of psychology experiments. In these experiments, test subjects are asked to solve a soma cube as many times as possible within a set period of time. For example, In 1969, Edward Deci, a Carnegie Mellon University graduate assistant at the time, asked his research subjects to solve a soma cube under conditions with varying incentives in his dissertation work on intrinsic and extrinsic motivation establishing the social psychological theory of crowding out.

In each of the 240 distinct solutions to the cube puzzle, there is only one place that the "T" piece can be placed. Each solved cube can be rotated such that the "T" piece is on the bottom with its long edge along the front and the "tongue" of the "T" in the bottom center cube (this is the normalized position of the large cube). This can be proven as follows: If you consider all the possible ways that the "T" piece can be placed in the large cube (without regard to any of the other pieces), it will be seen that it will always fill either two corners of the large cube or zero corners. There is no way to orient the "T" piece such that it fills only one corner of the large cube. The "L" piece can be oriented such that it fills two corners, or one corner, or zero corners. Each of the other five pieces have no orientation that fills two corners; they can fill either one corner or zero corners. Therefore, if you exclude the "T" piece, the maximum number of corners that can be filled by the remaining six pieces is seven (one corner each for five pieces, plus two corners for the "L" piece). A cube has eight corners. But the "T" piece cannot be oriented to fill just that one remaining corner, and orienting it such that it fills zero corners will obviously not make a cube. Therefore, the "T" must always fill two corners, and there is only one orientation (discounting rotations and reflections) in which it does that. It also follows from this that in all solutions, five of the remaining six pieces will fill their maximum number of corners and one piece will fill one fewer than its maximum (this is called the deficient piece).

Figures

In addition to constructing a cube, the SOMA manual provides assorted figures to construct with the seven pieces. The figure on the right shows solutions to some of the figures in the same colour scheme.

Similar puzzles
Similar to Soma cube is the 3D pentomino puzzle, which can fill boxes of 2×3×10, 2×5×6 and 3×4×5 units.

The Bedlam cube is a 4×4×4 sided cube puzzle consisting of twelve pentacubes and one tetracube. The Diabolical cube is a puzzle of six polycubes that can be assembled together to form a single 3×3×3 cube.

Eye Level also makes use of the Thinking Cube (once students are in levels 30-32 of Basic Thinking Math or levels 29-32 of Critical Thinking Math), as one of its manipulatives, similar to the Soma cube.

See also
 Tangram
 Tetromino
 Tromino
 Snake cube

References

External links

 http://www.mathematik.uni-bielefeld.de/~sillke/POLYCUBE/SOMA/cube-secrets
 Soma Cube – from MathWorld
 Thorleif's SOMA page
 SOMA CUBE ANIMATION by TwoDoorsOpen and Friends

Mechanical puzzle cubes
Tiling puzzles
Recreational mathematics